Tanya Hetherington (born 14 April 1985) is a retired Australian rules footballer who played for the Greater Western Sydney Giants in the AFL Women's competition. 

Hetherington played state league football with Diamond Creek in the Victorian Women's Football League and later in the VFL Women's competition. In 2015 she suffered a major knee injury and went un-selected in the 2016 AFL Women's draft somewhat as a result. Hetherington was drafted by Greater Western Sydney with their third pick and the seventeenth selection overall in the 2017 AFL Women's draft. Hetherington announced her retirement in October 2022.

References

External links 

1985 births
Living people
Greater Western Sydney Giants (AFLW) players
Australian rules footballers from Victoria (Australia)
Victorian Women's Football League players